Teamtoppen 1 is a compilation released in 1985 by Agnetha Fältskog.

Track listing
"Gulleplutt"
"En Sommar Med Dej"
"Min Farbror Jonathan"
"Hjärtats Saga"
"Lek Med Dina Dockor"
"Om Tårar Vore Guld"
"Utan Dej Mitt Liv Går Vidare"
"Hjärtats Kronprins"
"Följ Med Mig"
"Mina ögon"
"Var Det Med dej?"
"Som Ett Eko"

1985 compilation albums
Agnetha Fältskog compilation albums